Tummy Touch Records is an international record label with offices in London, UK and New York City, USA best known for releasing quirky dance and downtempo music. Artists on Tummy Touch include Groove Armada, Patrick & Eugene, Niyi, Tutto Matto, Tom Vek, and label founder Tim Lee.

Tummy Touch Music Group
Tummy Touch Records is a part of the Tummy Touch Music Group (TTMG). TTMG does production, publishing, licensing, and manages a stock music library in association with KPM Musichouse for commercial uses called Tummy Touch Moods. Tummy Touch Moods artists include Keith Mansfield, Alan Hawkshaw, Alan Parker, and John Cameron.

TTMG oversees the publishing rights to the Katrina And The Waves music catalog which includes the hit "Walking On Sunshine".

Tummy Touch Music Group also works with RAK Records publishing division to put out new and re-released material from the RAK catalog.

History
Tummy Touch was founded 1996 in the UK by Tim Lee aka Tim 'Love' Lee. Their first release was "The Nightlife EP" - by Stop / E.D.O. (MBTT 001). Groove Armada had their first 12" vinyl release on Tummy Touch in 1997 with "Captain Sensual" (MBTT 003) and "At the River" (TUCH011), which hit 19 on the UK Singles Chart. Groove Armada's first album Northern Star (TUCH 103) also came out on Tummy Touch on 9 March 1998. The label uses Bandcamp extensively to distribute mainly sampler anthologies of its artists.

Artists
Alan Moorhouse
Alan Parker & John Cameron
Bagel Boys
The Bandana Splits
Beardyman
Ben Smith
Benji Cossa
Bilkis
Bing Ji Ling
Black Gold 360
Breakdown
Chantilly
Chungking
Circuits
CJ Mirra
Coco Electrik
Cousin Grizzly
Crackpot
Crazy Girl
dawn Landes
Dear Georgiana
The Dirty Feel
DJ DRM
DJ Fee
Dolphin Boy
Double Identity
Dynamo Dresden
Ed Motta
EDO
The Electric Moccasins of Doom
Fimber Bravo
The Fishermen Three
Fly By Pony
Groove Armada
Guessman
Hello Skinny
Huw Costin
In Flagranti
Jack & The Pulpits
Jack Dangers
Janka Nabay & The Bubu Gang
Jason Trachtenburg
Jeremy Mage & The Magi
Jessie Baylin
Joe Richardson
Joni Haastrup
Junkie Slip
Justin Anderson
Justin Drake
Katrina & The Waves
Keith Mansfield & Alan Hawkshaw
Kimberly Rew
King Mono
Kokoro Thief
KPM
La Rue
Le Pico
Leather Tuscadero
Leeboy & Spence
Leo Young
Little Barrie
Los Chicharrons
The Lovers
Mains Ignition
Mammal
Marco Benevento
Marlon Sea
Matt Lutz
Melt Yourself Down
Mescalito
Mossyrock
New Young Pony Club
Nitwood
Niyi
No Hassle From The Man
Organic Audio
Patrick and Eugene
Patrick Dawes
The Pendulum Swings
The Phenomenal Handclap Band
Phil Nicholl
Phondupe
Project Trio
Quad Throw Salchow
Red Cassette
Revolvo
Rich Davey
Robots In Disguise
Royal Appointment
The Rural Serenaders 
The Saltlands Band
Samuel Purdey
Sargasso Trio
Shawn Lee
Sheer Velocity
Shod
Shuffle
Si Begg
Skylab
Sons Of Kemet
Souvenir
Spiersy
The Stag Heads
The Steamboat Cabaret 
Steve Arrington
Stop
Stratus
Striplight
Stuntmen
Sunny Face
Supercute
Superhuman Happiness
Superspirit
Swimming
Tara Busch
The Test Signals Orchestra 
Thieving Irons
Tim 'Love' Lee
Tom Vek
Tony Global
The Toy Band
Trachtenburg Family Slideshow Players
Trwbador
Turbo Men
Turner Cody
Tutto Matto
The Waves
Waxploitation
We Show Up On Radar
The Wowz
Wrake & Bonnell
Xavier
Zook

References

External links
 Tummy Touch on Discogs.com
 Tummy Touch Records official site
 Tummy Touch on Last.fm
 [ Tim 'Love' Lee on allmusic.com]

British record labels
Electronic dance music record labels
Electronic music record labels
House music record labels
Record labels established in 1996